Lorraine Hanson ( Dobb) is a former Doncaster Belles and England women's international footballer. She competed at the 1984 European Competition for Women's Football where she missed a penalty during the shoot-outs in the second leg of the final against Sweden.

References

Living people
English women's footballers
England women's international footballers
Women's association football defenders
1959 births
Doncaster Rovers Belles L.F.C. players
Footballers from Worksop